"Lost in Japan" is a song recorded by Canadian singer Shawn Mendes. It was written by Mendes, Scott Harris, Nate Mercereau and Teddy Geiger, with production handled by Mendes, Mercereau, Geiger and Louis Bell. The song was released by Island Records on March 23, 2018, as a second single for Mendes' self-titled third studio album. An official remix by German music producer Zedd was released on September 27, 2018.

Release
The song's title was first spotted in the background of Mendes' Instagram posts from when he was recording the album in Jamaica, leading to speculation on the possibility of Mendes releasing two singles, hence the two dates in an earlier teaser. He announced the song mere hours after the release of "In My Blood", writing on Twitter: "Wanted to give you another song".

Composition
"Lost in Japan" is a funk, pop and R&B song, with "funky strings and driving bass" that bears resemblances to the work of Justin Timberlake. During interviews, Mendes stated that he was inspired by all of the Timberlake songs he was listening to at the time, especially Justified–and a dream. "I had this dream that I was lost in this country and I woke up the next day and we had this cool piano part and the song was birthed."

Lars Brandle of Billboard wrote that the song "opens with a subtle spell of piano then changes gears with a fat bass sound and groove". It transformed from "a slow, piano-driven number" into "a passionate, hook-laden love song", according to CBS Radio's Robyn Collins. Lyrically, Mendes offers to travel the globe in order to be closer to his love interest.

Critical reception
Mike Nied of Idolator regarded the "atmospheric" song as "another solid gold bop", complimenting its ability "to present a new, more mature version of the superstar". Sam Damshenas of Gay Times opined that the song "displays a saucier, funkier side" to Mendes. Jordan Sargent of Spin praised the track, deeming it "notably well-made pop music" and "refreshingly spacious," despite being ambivalent towards his previous single "In My Blood". Billboard named it the 22nd best song of the first half of 2018, Elle considered it the 2nd, while Uproxx listed it at No. 8 for the best pop songs of 2018.

Credits and personnel
Credits adapted from Tidal.

 Shawn Mendes – vocals, background vocals, songwriting, production, guitar
 Scott Harris – songwriting, guitar
 Nate Mercereau – songwriting, additional production, keyboard, bass, guitar, percussion, piano
 Teddy Geiger – background vocals, songwriting, production, drums, guitar, percussion, programming
 Louis Bell – additional production
 Harry Burr – mixing assistance, studio personnel
 Andrew Maury – mixing, studio personnel
 George Seara –  vocal engineering, studio personnel

Charts

Weekly charts

Year-end charts

Certifications

Release history

Zedd remix

A remix of "Lost in Japan" by Zedd was released on September 27, 2018, and was sent to the US contemporary hit radio on October 2, 2018.

Music video
A music video for the song was released on October 25, 2018. The video features both the original and remix versions of the song. The music video reenacts scenes from the 2003 film Lost in Translation, where Mendes plays the role of Bob (originally portrayed by Bill Murray). It features guest appearances from Norwegian actress Alisha Boe (who plays Scarlett Johansson's character Charlotte) and remixer Zedd. The music video was directed by Jay Martin and shot by Kai Saul.

Credits and personnel
Credits adapted from Tidal.
 Shawn Mendes – vocals, background vocals, songwriting, production, guitar
 Scott Harris – songwriting, guitar
 Nate Mercereau – songwriting, additional production, keyboard, bass, guitar, percussion, piano
 Teddy Geiger – background vocals, songwriting, production, drums, guitar, percussion, programming
 Louis Bell – additional production
 Harry Burr – mixing assistance, studio personnel
 Andrew Maury – mixing, studio personnel
 George Seara –  vocal engineering, studio personnel
 Zedd – additional production, remixing, studio personnel

Charts

Release history

References

2018 songs
2018 singles
Funk songs
Island Records singles
Shawn Mendes songs
Songs written by Shawn Mendes
Songs written by Scott Harris (songwriter)
Songs written by Teddy Geiger
Song recordings produced by Louis Bell
Zedd songs
Songs about Japan